Chrysallida gemmulosa is a species of sea snail, a marine gastropod mollusk in the family Pyramidellidae, the pyrams and their allies. The species is one of a number within the genus Chrysallida.

Distribution
This species occurs in the following locations:
 Caribbean Sea
 Colombia
 Cuba
 Gulf of Mexico
 Jamaica
 Mexico
 Panama
 Puerto Rico

References

External links
 To Encyclopedia of Life
 To ITIS
 To World Register of Marine Species

gemmulosa
Gastropods described in 1850